Linuron (3-(3,4-dichlorophenyl)-1-methoxy-1-methylurea) is a phenylurea herbicide that is used to control the growth of grass and weeds for the purpose of supporting the growth of crops like soybeans.

Pharmacology

Mechanism of action
Linuron acts via inhibition of photosystem II, which is necessary for photosynthetic electron transport in plants.

Effects in animals
Linuron has been found to produce reproductive toxicity in animals by acting as an androgen receptor (AR) antagonist, and for this reason, is considered to be an endocrine disruptor. Consequently, in January 2017, the Standing Committee on Plants, Animals, Food and Feed (SCoPAFF) of the European Commission DG "Health and food safety" decided to not renew its regulatory approval. Sales are expected to cease by June 2017.

See also 
 Diuron
 Monolinuron

References 

Endocrine disruptors
Herbicides
Nonsteroidal antiandrogens
Organochlorides
Ureas